Deh Pish or Deh-e Pish may refer to:
 Deh Pish-e Olya, Jiroft
 Deh Pish-e Sofla, Jiroft
 Deh Pish-e Olya, Kahnuj
 Deh Pish-e Sofla, Kahnuj